William Walter Foster (July 22, 1922 – January 25, 2000) was a former Republican member of the Pennsylvania House of Representatives.

References

Republican Party members of the Pennsylvania House of Representatives
2000 deaths
1922 births
20th-century American politicians
People from Wayne County, Pennsylvania